The View Askewniverse is a fictional universe created by writer/director Kevin Smith, featured in several films, comics and a television series; it is named for Smith's production company, View Askew Productions. The characters Jay and Silent Bob appear in almost all the View Askewniverse media, and characters from one story often reappear or are referred to in others. Smith often casts the same actors for multiple characters in the universe, sometimes even in the same film; Smith himself portrays the character of Silent Bob.

Setting
Smith's recurring characters, settings, and motifs first appeared in his debut film, Clerks. Since then, the main canon has consisted of nine feature films, in addition to several short films, comic books, and a short-lived animated TV series. The View Askewniverse is centered on the towns of Leonardo, Highlands, and Red Bank, all located in Monmouth County, central New Jersey. Chasing Amy also takes place partly in New York City, while Dogma, Jay and Silent Bob Strike Back, and Jay and Silent Bob Reboot involve road trips.

Films

Clerks (1994) 

The first film in the series of the View Askewniverse, Clerks follows a day in the lives of two store clerks, Dante Hicks (Brian O'Halloran) and Randal Graves (Jeff Anderson). Dante is called into work at the Quick Stop convenience store on his day off until the boss can relieve him at noon. As Dante serves a succession of customers, he repeatedly complains that he is "not even supposed to be here today". Randal works at RST Video next door, although he spends almost the entire day relaxing at the Quick Stop. Dante learns he will be working all day, and decides to close the store for brief periods to play hockey on the roof and to attend a memorial service for his ex-girlfriend. An old flame now engaged surprises him with a visit. The two had been talking on the phone for months and after seeing each other again they are keen to reunite and leave their current relationships.

Mallrats (1995)

Two young men, Brodie Bruce and T.S. Quint, hang out at a mall after being dumped by their girlfriends, while also trying to avoid the wrath of Shannon Hamilton. The film occurs one day before the events of Clerks.

Chasing Amy (1997) 

A heterosexual man, Holden McNeil, falls in love with a lesbian woman, Alyssa Jones, causing conflict with his homophobic best friend, Banky Edwards, with whom he has created a comic book called Bluntman and Chronic based upon their friends Jay and Silent Bob.

Dogma (1999) 

The world ends if two angels enter a church in New Jersey and Jesus' last scion, Jay and Silent Bob, and the thirteenth Apostle have to stop them.

Jay and Silent Bob Strike Back (2001) 

Jay and Silent Bob embark on a road-trip to Hollywood to try to stop production of a Bluntman and Chronic movie. Within the film, the Bluntman and Chronic movie was to be based on the comic made by the protagonists of Chasing Amy.

Clerks II (2006) 

Roughly ten years after Clerks, after an accident destroys the Quick Stop, Dante and Randal are now employed in the fast food industry.

Jay & Silent Bob's Super Groovy Cartoon Movie! (2013) 

The animated film depicts the events within the Bluntman and Chronic comic written by the protagonists of Chasing Amy, which was to be adapted into a movie in Jay and Silent Bob Strike Back. Kevin Smith adapted the script from the Bluntman and Chronic comics story he had originally written as a companion piece to the film Jay and Silent Bob Strike Back.

Jay and Silent Bob Reboot (2019) 

After losing the legal rights to their names over a film reboot of Bluntman and Chronic, Jay and Silent Bob travel across the United States to try to prevent the reboot from being made.

Clerks III (2022)

Following the release of Clerks II, Smith reported that, for several years after, a script was finished but production was delayed in favor of other projects. By February 2017, he announced via his social media page that development had stopped, and the film would not be made, when Jeff Anderson dropped out of the project.

By September 2019, Smith announced that he had scrapped the previous draft, and had begun working a whole new script for the project. The filmmaker confirmed that many of the creatives from the previous films would return, including Jason Mewes, Jeff Anderson and Brian O'Halloran. The new Clerks III would follow Dante and Randal, after surviving a heart attack, making a movie at the store. The plot was initially conceived for a film adaptation of Clerks: The Animated Series titled Clerks: Sell Out. Principal photography began on August 2, 2021, in Red Bank, New Jersey. Filming wrapped on August 31, 2021. The film was released on September 13, 2022, by Lionsgate and Fathom Events.

Upcoming

Twilight of the Mallrats (TBA)
On March 12, 2015, Kevin Smith confirmed that Mallrats 2 was being written and was slated to begin shooting in May 2016. In April 2015, Smith announced that Mallrats 2 would be his next film, instead of Clerks III as originally intended, and would begin production the following year. In January 2020, Smith announced that development on Mallrats 2 has started up again, under a new title Twilight of the Mallrats.

Related films

 Drawing Flies: Much of the cast of Mallrats featured in a simultaneous View Askew Productions film titled, Drawing Flies. A couple of actors portray the same characters, with Kevin Smith credited as Silent Bob. Smith also wore the same wardrobe within the two films.
 Scream 3: Jay and Silent Bob appear in Scream 3, during a scene which shows the pair in-studio. Jay comedically mistakes one of the main protagonists, named Gale Weathers-Riley, for television reporter Connie Chung and sarcastically asks her about Maury Povich.
 Zack and Miri Make a Porno: Though Smith previously stated that the film is not set within the Askewniverse, he later added the character of Brandon St. Randy as a part of Jay and Silent Bob Reboot. The character features as the lawyer of Jay, Silent Bob, and Saban Films.
 Madness in the Method: Directed by Jason Mewes, from a script co-written by Chris Anastasi and Dominic Burns, the film features the characters Jay and Silent Bob. The film was released on August 2, 2019.

Short films 
 The Flying Car: A short film featuring Dante and Randal, that was produced for The Tonight Show with Jay Leno in 2002.
Clerks: The Lost Scene: An animated short, that was produced in 2004 for Clerks X (10th anniversary DVD). The release is based on a scene previously off-screen from Clerks, that had previously been depicted in the comics.

Television 

 Clerks: The Animated Series: A traditionally animated series, that consisted of six episodes featuring the main characters from the Clerks film. The series aired on ABC in 2000, only to be discontinued after two episodes were released on network television. The entire series was later released directly to DVD in 2001.
 Clerks: A live-action pilot episode, for a television series adaptation, based on Clerks. Kevin Smith had no involvement with the television series' adaptation.
 Jay and Silent Bob Shorts: A series of short skits, which aired on MTV.
 Jay and Silent Bob Rename Your Favorite TV Show: Released throughout 2005, as a portion of I Love the '90s. The routine was released on VH1. 
 I Love the '90s: Part Deux: The second release from VH1, as a part of the I Love the '90s series. The show released in 2005.
 Degrassi: The Next Generation: The series adapted a fictional filming of Jay and Silent Bob Go Canadian, Eh?, over the span of three of its episodes.
 My Name Is Earl: The series, which stars Jason Lee and Ethan Suplee who have co-starred in numerous films directed by Kevin Smith, made references to the films.
 The Flash (2014 TV series): Jay and Silent Bob cameo as security guards in the episode "Null and Annoyed".

Digital

Jay and Silent Bob VR
In 2018, STX Entertainment announced that their Surreal division was working with Kevin Smith on a VR series that would star Jay and Silent Bob.

Recurring cast and characters 
Smith often casts the same actors for multiple characters in the universe, sometimes even in the same film. This is most notable in Jay and Silent Bob Strike Back, in which several actors play multiple characters from earlier View Askewniverse films.

Smith and Jason Mewes are the only actors to appear in every film as the same characters. Three other actors have appeared in every film, as different characters, Scott Mosier, Walt Flanagan and Brian O'Halloran, with O'Halloran always appearing as a member of the Hicks family (most notably Dante).

The more notable recurring actors include:

Comics 
 Clerks.: A three-part comic book series published in the late-'90s, which featured the continuing adventures of the main characters from Clerks.
 Chasing Dogma: A four-part series that details the adventures of Jay and Silent Bob, between the events of Chasing Amy and Dogma. Various elements from the story-arc were adapted into Jay and Silent Bob Strike Back.
 Bluntman and Chronic: Adapting the fictionally "created" comics by Holden McNeil and Banky Edwards in Chasing Amy, the series was published to coincide with the release of Jay and Silent Bob Strike Back.
 Jay and Silent Bob in Walt Flanagan's Dog: A story that was featured in Oni Double Feature #1.
 Where's the Beef?: A 20-page comic which adds further details to the events that were depicted in the opening scenes of Clerks II.
 Chasing Amy: In Japan, the screenplay of Chasing Amy was adapted into a novel by Kenichi Eguchi and published by Aoyama Publishing. It is a book that is roughly half-novel, half-manga, with Moyoco Anno providing the art for the comic book pages.
 Green Arrow: Jay and Silent Bob had a brief appearance in one panel of Green Arrow, Vol. 3 #6. The characters were depicted standing outside Jason Blood's Safe House in Star City. This issue was written by Kevin Smith during his 15-issue story-arc of the titular character.
 Angel: After the Fall: Demonic versions of Jay and Silent Bob can be seen in one panel, in issue #5. The characters are shown standing outside of a cafe in the safe haven of Silverlake. Writer Brian Lynch confirmed the reference and attributed their inclusion to artist Franco Urru.
 Aoi House: Though the pair are not identified by name, Jay and Silent Bob appear in the manga, in the background of the mall.
 Quick Stops: A four-part black and white comic series that focuses on the various characters of the View-Askewniverse and published by Dark Horse Comics.

Video games 
A beat 'em up video game titled Jay and Silent Bob: Chronic Blunt Punch was funded in April 2016, and has yet to be released.  The game began production after being successfully crowdfunded on Fig.

Another beat 'em up video game titled Jay and Silent Bob: Mall Brawl released to the backers of Chronic Blunt Punch for free on Steam in 2020.  It is available to purchase digitally on Steam, Nintendo Switch, and PlayStation 4.  Limited Run Games released a physical edition, with pre-orders becoming available for purchase on April 20, 2021. An NES port was also released shortly after its launch on modern platforms.

Jay and Silent Bob appear as cameo characters in Randal's Monday, a point-and-click adventure game published by Daedalic Entertainment . Jason Mewes reprises his role as Jay.  The main character of the game is named Randal Hicks (a name combining both Randal Graves and Dante Hicks, the protagonists of Clerks), and is voiced by Jeff Anderson, the actor for Randal Graves in the View Askewniverse films. However, the character and plot of the game bear no relation to Clerks or the View Askewniverse.

Additional crew and production details

Franchise chronology 
Jay and Silent Bob in Walt Flanagan's Dog
Mallrats
Clerks
Clerks: The Animated Series
The Flying Car
Clerks.
Chasing Amy
Chasing Dogma
Dogma
Jay and Silent Bob Strike Back
Bluntman and Chronic
Where's the Beef?
Clerks II
Zack and Miri Make a Porno
Jay and Silent Bob Reboot
Clerks III

Cancelled projects 
 Busing
Following Clerks, Smith wrote a film called Busing for Hollywood Pictures, a now-defunct Disney studio. It was described as "Clerks in a restaurant." The film was announced around 1994 and was intended to be part of the View Askewniverse. The film was not made, but the film was featured at the end of Jay and Silent Bob Strike Back as a poster parodying the Clerks poster.

 Name
A follow-up to Chasing Amy, Smith wrote a new film set in the View Askewniverse starring the trio from Amy that was not a sequel. Smith said "it was kind of porn-bent." Affleck and Adams were interested in doing the project, but plans eventually fell through. Smith's efforts to develop a project about pornography led to the 2008 film, Zack and Miri Make a Porno. Smith abandoned Name in favor of Dogma.

 Dogma II
In late November 2005, Smith responded to talk of a possible sequel to Dogma on the ViewAskew.com message boards:

Over a decade later, there has apparently been no further discussion. But in October 2017, Smith revealed that he no longer desired to make any new religious films.

Near the same time as the cancellation, just weeks before the Weinstein scandal broke to the public, Harvey Weinstein pitched to Smith about doing a sequel. Not much came from this pitch, but it was just a mere idea for Weinstein. According to Smith in an interview with Business Insider, he recalls:

Smith believes that he only got the call because, as he believes, "It was him looking to see who was a friend still because his life was about to shift completely."

 Clerks: Sell Out
For several years following the cancellation of Clerks: The Animated Series, Smith announced plans to make an animated film. He revealed in a commentary on Episode 6 that it would go theatrical (with the hopes to win an Academy Award for Best Animated Feature), but later made plans to go direct-to-video. The basic plot involved Dante and Randal making a movie about their lives at the Quick Stop, a reference to the production of the original film. In an interview, Kevin Smith expanded on the delays surrounding the film. He stated that when Harvey and Bob Weinstein left Miramax, owned at the time by The Walt Disney Company, the split was not completely amicable. The rights to the Clerks television series were still owned by Disney, who as a result were reluctant to work with The Weinstein Company, throwing the future of Clerks: Sell Out into question. At the 2007 Cornell Q&A, Smith said due to the Miramax/Weinstein argument "you will see a Jay and Silent Bob cartoon before Clerks: Sell Out."

Despite the fact that Sell Out might not get made, Smith's new script for the long-awaited Clerks III will follow the original plot from the animated film.

References

External links 
 The View Askewniverse - Company's Homepage
 News Askew
 The View Askewniverse on Google maps
 Radio Interview with Kevin Smith about the Askewniverse from FBi 94.5 Sydney Australia

 
Fictional universes
Film series introduced in 1994
Kevin Smith